Cola usambarensis is a species of flowering plant in the family Malvaceae. It is found only in Tanzania.

References

usambarensis
Endemic flora of Tanzania
Data deficient plants
Taxonomy articles created by Polbot